The 2015 SAFF U-16 Championship was the 3rd edition of the SAFF U-16 Championship, an international football competition for men's under-16 national teams organized by SAFF. The tournament was hosted by Bangladesh from 9–18 of August, 2015 at Sylhet District Stadium. Six teams from the region were taking part, divided into two groups. Bangladesh U16 beat India U16 in the final and claimed the title for the first time.

Host selection

Eligible teams

 
  (Host)

Participating teams

Group draw

Venues

Match officials
Referees

  Rahman Dali
  Md. Anisur Rahman
  L. Priyobrata Singh
  Nabindra Maharajan

Assistant referees

  Md Salim Miah
  Bitu Raj Barua
  Rahman Dali (Fourth Official)
  Nabindra Maharajan (Fourth Official)
  Ahmed Giyas
  Mohd Sharif Sarwari
  L. Priyobrata Singh (Fourth Official)

Match Commissioner

  Gokul Thapa

Referee Assessor

  Purushothaman Basker

General Coordinator

  Md Mohebul Kabir Rony

Squads

Group stage
 All matches were played in Sylhet, Bangladesh.
 Times listed are UTC+06:00.

Group A

Group B

Knockout stage

Semi-finals

Final

Winner

Awards
The following awards were given for the 2015 SAFF U-16 Championship.

Goalscorers

References

2015
2015 in Asian football
2015 in youth association football